Wuxi Wugo Football Club is a professional Chinese football club that currently participates in the China League Two. The team is based in Wuxi, Jiangsu.

History
Wuxi Xinje F.C. was founded in 2011. The club participated in Chinese Champions League in 2020 and was promoted to China League Two. In 2021, the club changed its name to Wuxi Wugou F.C. In March 2023, the club changed its name to Wuxi Wugo F.C.

Name history
2011–2020 Wuxi Xinje F.C. 无锡信捷
2021–2022 Wuxi Wugou F.C. 无锡吴钩
2023– Wuxi Wugo F.C. 无锡吴钩

Players

Current squad

References

External links
Soccerway

Wuxi Wugou F.C.
Association football clubs established in 2011
Sport in Wuxi
2011 establishments in China